Kim Yoo-jin (born March 3, 1981), known professionally as Eugene, is a South Korean singer and actress. She is best known as a former member of the girl group S.E.S., which went on to become one of South Korea's best-selling artists. Following the group's disbandment in 2002, she subsequently left SM Entertainment and released two solo studio albums.

As an actress, Eugene has participated in various television dramas and movies, making her acting debut in KBS2 Loving You (2002). Her other notable roles include in Save the Last Dance for Me (2004), Wonderful Life (2005), Bread, Love and Dreams (2010), A Hundred Year Legacy (2013), All About My Mom (2015) and The Penthouse: War in Life (2020–2021).

Early life 
Eugene was born in Seoul, South Korea. With the suggestion of her grandfather, who settled down in Guam, her family immigrated to Guam after she finished the first semester of 5th grade elementary school. She attended Agueda I. Johnston Middle School from October 1992 until June 1995, and John F. Kennedy High School from June until September 1997. She returned to Korea with her mother and younger sister to finish high school, and eventually graduated from Korea Kent Foreign School, Seoul in June 1999. At high school, more than 80% of her subjects were A credits. In elementary school, only 23 out of 24 subjects were awarded. In middle school, almost all her subjects were excellent.

Career

S.E.S. 

Eugene made her debut with S.E.S. in 1997. S.E.S enjoyed tremendous success, becoming the top-selling K-pop girl group, until Twice broke their record in 2019. The group broke up at the end of 2002 after Bada and Eugene parted ways from SM Entertainment, while Shoo stayed with SM Entertainment until 2006.

On May 28, 2016, Eugene with S.E.S. members Bada and Shoo attended a charity event, Green Heart Bazaar. In October 2016, Eugene along with Bada and Shoo re-formed S.E.S. to celebrate their 20th anniversary since the debut of the group. They started their project of the 20th anniversary debut with released digital single "Love[Story]", a remake of their 1999 single "Love", through SM Entertainment's digital project SM Station on November 28 and its music video released on December 29.

In early December 2016, they aired their ten episode reality show Remember, I'm Your S.E.S., which broadcast through mobile app Oksusu. To accompany their 20th anniversary debut, they held a concert, Remember, the Day, on December 30 and 31 at Sejong University's Daeyang Hall in Seoul.

On January 2, the special album of their 20th anniversary debut Remember was released. The album consists of double lead singles. "Remember" was digitally released on January 1 and "Paradise" was released along with the album on January 2. They held a fanmeet as their last project of 20th anniversary debut called I Will Be There, Waiting For You on March 1, 2017.

Solo career

After S.E.S. broke up in late 2002, Kim starred in four Korean dramas: Loving You, Save The Last Dance for Me, Wonderful Life, and Love Truly. She also appeared in commercials and advertisements, and released two solo albums. My True Style, her first album, sold nearly 65,000 records and had one hit ballad, "The Best". Her second album 810303 sold a disappointing 19,000 copies. Although sales were low, the single "Windy" was successful, as it was nominated for first place on the music show Music Camp.

Eugene made her theater debut in the musical adaptation of the film Innocent Steps and her film debut in Unstoppable Marriage. After taking on the lead roles in the dramas One Mom and Three Dads, and Creating Destiny, Eugene then starred in the television series King of Baking, Kim Takgu, which was a huge hit and earned "national drama" status.

In 2007 Eugene took over from Lee Hyori as one of the co-hosts of the variety show Happy Together Friends, until the show was overhauled for a third season. After the success of her previous program Eugene's Makeup Diary, cable style network O'live again chose her as the host of new show Get It Beauty which began airing in July 2010.

Eugene has authored two books: Eugene's Beauty Secrets and Eugene's Get It Beauty. She is also the co-president of the clothing brand byMOMO.

In 2012 she became the host of season 3 of MBC's revamped flagship amateur singing competition show The Great Birth. Her next leading role was in the 2013 weekend family drama A Hundred Year Legacy, which reached ratings of over 30 percent. She then starred in two more family dramas, Can We Fall in Love, Again? and All About My Mom.

On December 17, 2018, it was announced that Eugene had signed with INN Company after deciding not to renew her contract with C9 Entertainment.

In 2020, she appeared in TV series The Penthouse: War in Life aired on SBS TV from October 26.

In 2022, Eugene will attend a fan sign event in front of the Lotte World Mall Jamsil store from 7pm on the 12th.

Personal life
On May 11, 2011, Eugene announced she would be married to Ki Tae-young, her leading man in the 2009 TV series Creating Destiny. Their wedding was held at the Seoul Central Church in Anyang, Gyeonggi-do, on July 23, 2011. They were the first couple featured on Super Couple Diary, a reality show filming the daily married life of celebrity couples. Eugene gave birth to their first child, a daughter named Ro-hee on April 12, 2015. She also gave birth to another girl, Ro-rin, on August 18, 2018.

After the sinking of the MV Sewol, fans of Eugene began to doubt her belief in the Evangelical Baptist Church of Korea. She explained she is not a believer of the Evangelical Baptist Church, but in the Korean Christianity Baptist Church which separated from the Evangelical Baptist Church 32 years ago.

Discography

Studio albums

Soundtrack contributions

Participation in albums

Filmography

Film

Television series

Television show

Web shows

Hosting

Musical theatre

Books 
 Eugene's Beauty Secrets (2009)
 Eugene's Get It Beauty (2011)

Awards and nominations

References

External links 
 

1981 births
Living people
S.E.S. (group) members
South Korean Baptists
South Korean women pop singers
South Korean film actresses
South Korean musical theatre actresses
South Korean female idols
South Korean television actresses
Korea University alumni
Singers from Seoul
Actresses from Seoul
People from Seoul
Guamanian actresses
Guamanian people of Korean descent